Nicholas Aysshton was an English politician who was MP for Liskeard in May 1421, Helston in 1422, 1423, 1425, 1427, and 1435, Launceston in 1431 and 1432, and Cornwall in 1437 and 1439. He was a justice of the peace in Cornwall, Devon, Dorset, Hampshire, Somerset, Surrey, and Wiltshire; a steward and receiver of Caliland; and a serjeant-at-law. His son was Edward Aysshton.

References

English MPs May 1421
English MPs 1422
English MPs 1423
English MPs 1425
English MPs 1427
English MPs 1431
English MPs 1432
English MPs 1435
English MPs 1437
English MPs 1439
Members of the Parliament of England (pre-1707) for Liskeard
Members of the Parliament of England for Helston
Members of the Parliament of England for Launceston
Members of the Parliament of England (pre-1707) for Cornwall
Stewards (office)
Serjeants-at-law (England)
English justices of the peace